The Sweet Inspirations is the self-titled debut album by American recording soul/gospel female group the Sweet Inspirations, released in 1967 by Atlantic Records. Led by Cissy Houston, the Sweet Inspirations were highly-in-demand female back-up singers featured on some of the most important pop and soul recordings of the 1960s and '70s. They toured and served as session background vocals on albums by various artists' including Elvis Presley, Aretha Franklin, Wilson Pickett and Dusty Springfield. This was their first album, recorded in 1967, in which it contains mostly covers of the hits of the day. The album peaked at number 12 on Billboard's Hot Soul Albums, and features the Top 20 hit "Sweet Inspiration" plus the R&B chart hits "Why (Am I Treated So Bad)" and "Let It Be Me".

Track listing
All tracks supervised by Jerry Wexler
Recording engineer: Tom Dowd

Side A

"Oh! What a Fool I've Been" (Darryl Carter, Lindon Dewey Oldham, Wallace Pennington) - 2:36
"Blues Stay Away from Me" (Alton Delmore, Henry Glover, Rabon Delmore, Wayne Raney) - 3:22
"Don't Let Me Lose This Dream" (Ted White, Aretha Franklin) - 2:20
"Knock on Wood" (Eddie Floyd, Steve Cropper) - 3:30
"Do Right Woman, Do Right Man" (Chips Moman, Dan Penn) - 3:30
"Don't Fight It" (Steve Cropper, Wilson Pickett) - 2:25

Side B

"Sweet Inspiration" (Lindon Dewey Oldham, Wallace Pennington) - 2:50
"Let It Be Me" (Gilbert Bécaud, Mann Curtis, Pierre Delanoë) - 2:41
"I'm Blue" (Ike Turner) - 2:08
"Reach Out for Me" (Hal David, Burt Bacharach) - 2:19
"Here I Am (Take Me)" (David Porter, Isaac Hayes) - 3:04
"Why (Am I Treated So Bad)" (Roebuck Staples) - 2:46

Production
Design: Loring Eutemey
Producer: Tom Dowd, Tommy Cogbill
Supervised: Jerry Wexler
Recording engineers: Chips Moman, Daryl Carter
Stephen Paley - cover photograph

Charts

Singles

References

External links
Album-The Sweet Inspirations by Sweet Inspirations

1967 debut albums
Sweet Inspirations albums
Albums produced by Tom Dowd
Albums produced by Tommy Cogbill
Atlantic Records albums